Wang Junkai (born 21 September 1999), also known as Karry Wang, is a Chinese singer and actor. He was a trainee of TF Family since 2010 and debuted as the leader of TFBOYS in 2013. He is one of China's wealthiest people born after 1990, with a personal net worth of 248 million yuan (US$36 million) as of December 2016.

Early life and education
Wang Junkai was born in Chongqing, China. Junkai grew up mostly under his grandparents' care due to his parents' busy work schedules. His father used to be a taxi driver and his mother used to work as a hairdresser. In late 2010, he became one of the trainees under the TF Entertainment, and becoming the only trainee later then. 
Prior to his debut, Junkai participated in TF Family's mini album I Don't Want to Change. He has released several cover songs online, and participated in audition programs. In particular, his cover of "Onion" (originally by Aska Yang) received attention and was covered by several news outlets. He officially debuted as a member of TFBOYS on August 6, 2013, at the age of 13 alongside Roy Wang and Jackson Yee.

In 2017, he was enrolled into the Beijing Film Academy after having passed the college entrance examination; which received much media fanfare. He graduated in 2021.

Career 
In 2016, Wang released his first solo single "Ode to A Tree", which he took part in composing. In July, Wang released his second solo single, "Memory in Ferris Wheel" as part of the soundtrack of web series Finding Soul. The OST reached number 1 on the Billboard China V Chart for 3 consecutive weeks. The same year, Wang had a supporting role in Zhang Yimou's film The Great Wall.

He released his third single "Homeward" in January 2017, produced by Li Ronghao. "Homeward" was named as one of the Top 10 Songs at the Fresh Asia Chart Festival 2017. In April, he joined the cast of variety program Give Me Five. The same year, Wang was named as the Chinese promotional ambassador for the film Kingsman: The Golden Circle and released the theme song "Become a Gentleman". In September, Wang released a single titled "Karry On" as part of as eighteenth birthday celebration. He then starred in the Chinese film adaptation of popular Japanese novel Miracles of the Namiya General Store, which premiered in December 2017. He sang the theme song of the film, titled "Train in the Mist" with Li Jian. Wang won the Golden Phoenix Awards for Best Newcomer with Namiya.

In 2018, Wang starred in the youth adventure drama Eagles and Youngster. The same year, it was announced that he will star in the fantasy animated film L.O.R.D: Legend of Ravaging Dynasties 2.

In 2019, Wang starred in the film Bureau 749 directed by Lu Chuan.

On 1 November 2019, Wang held his first solo concert called Karry's Dream Concert 2019 in Cadillac Center.

Other activities 
Wang held the Guinness World Record Holder for having "the most reposted Weibo post" in 2015.

In March 2017, Wang was invited by Nike to take part in the design process of the new Air Max sneakers.
In June, Wang made his walkway debut for fashion house Dolce & Gabbana during the Men's Spring/Summer 2018 fashion shows in Milan. 
The same year, Wang became the youngest male celebrity to grace the front cover of Harper's Bazaar and L'Officiel Hommes.

In December 2017, Wang was announced as the global brand ambassador for Swatch. In the same month, it was announced that the Industrial and Commercial Bank of China (ICBC) will work with Visa China and Wang, to bring to the public tailor-made "Galaxy·Karry Wang" credit card.

On 21 November 2018, Wang severed his ties with Dolce & Gabbana, ultimately ending his role as the ambassador for the brand after the Shanghai event controversy.

In August 2019, he appeared as a special guest with Ashin at Mayday's concert (Mayday 2019 Just Rock It!!!"蓝| BLUE) held at Beijing National Stadium, performing "Onion" with the band.

Social activities
In March 2017, Wang was appointed as one of the "Special Envoy of Youth Action" for "World Life Day", a joint campaign by the United Nations Environment Programme, International Fund for Animal Welfare and The Nature Conservancy.
 
On his 18th birthday, Wang announced the set up his own charity foundation – "Kindle Blue Fund". Its first project is to build a library for children who lived in the mountain area.

In April 2018, Wang was appointed by United Nations Environment Programme as the UN Environment National Goodwill Ambassador.

In 2019, Wang ranked 12th on Forbes China Celebrity 100 list.

In 2020, Wang ranked 10th on Forbes China Celebrity 100 list.

Discography

Filmography

Film

Television series

Variety show

Awards and nominations

Forbes China Celebrity 100

References

External links 

 
 
 Wang Junkai's Weibo

1999 births
Living people
Chinese idols
Chinese child singers
Chinese male child actors
Chinese male film actors
Chinese male television actors
Chinese Mandopop singers
21st-century Chinese male actors
Singers from Chongqing
Male actors from Chongqing
21st-century Chinese male singers